John A. Smith may refer to:

 John Abel Smith (1802–1871), British Member of Parliament
 John Alexander Smith (1863–1939), British philosopher
 John Ambler Smith (1847–1892), American politician from Virginia
 John Armstrong Smith (1814–1892), American politician from Ohio
 John A. Smith (Mississippi politician) (1847–1910), American state senator in Mississippi

See also
 John Smith (disambiguation)